The Leigh 30 is an American sailboat that was designed by Chuck Paine as a cruiser and first built in 1979.

The Leigh 30 design is also known as the Morris 30 and is similar to the Victoria 30, both Paine designs. The Victoria 30 was built by Victoria Yachts in England.

Production
The design was built by Morris Yachts in Bass Harbor, Maine, United States. The company built 19 examples of the design, starting in 1979, but it is now out of production.

Design
The Leigh 30 is a recreational keelboat, built predominantly of fiberglass, with wood trim. It has a cutter rig, a raked stem, a canoe transom, a keel-mounted  rudder controlled by a tiller and a fixed long keel with the forefoot cutaway. A wheel was optional. It displaces  and carries  of lead ballast.

The boats were built with a variety of lower deck layouts, but typical is a galley on the port side with a two-burner kerosene stove, top-loading ice box and a sink with manual water pump. The head is located just aft of the bow "V"-berth, with a hanging locker opposite. There is additional sleeping accommodation in the main cabin, with a starboard pilot berth, a settee and very small port side berth. The wood used in the interior is pine and mahogany, with additional painted wood. Teak is employed above decks.

Ventilation is provided by nine bronze ports that open, plus two hatches, one over the main cabin and the other in the bow.

The cockpit has two main winches, plus a halyard winch and additional sheeting winch on the coach house roof. There are inboard genoa tracks and a bow roller for a CQR anchor on the bow.

Operational history
In a review Richard Sherwood wrote, "the Leigh is moderate displacement, but the ballast/displacement ratio is 48 percent and she is stiff. The high freeboard is extended by bulwarks, making for a dry boat. The keel is moderately long, the forefoot cut away, and the sail plan balanced, so she should steer easily."

See also
List of sailing boat types

Similar sailboats
Alberg 30
Alberg Odyssey 30
Aloha 30
Annie 30
Bahama 30
Bristol 29.9
C&C 30
C&C 30 Redwing
Catalina 30
Catalina 309
CS 30
Grampian 30
Hunter 30
Hunter 30T
Hunter 30-2
Mirage 30
Mirage 30 SX
Nonsuch 30
O'Day 30
Pearson 303
S2 9.2
Santana 30/30
Seafarer 30
Southern Cross 28
Tanzer 31

References

Keelboats
1970s sailboat type designs
Sailing yachts
Sailboat type designs by Chuck Paine
Sailboat types built by Morris Yachts